Anton Faistauer (14 February 1887, Sankt Martin bei Lofer – 13 February 1930, Vienna) was an Austrian Expressionist painter.

Life 
He came from a family of farmers, grew up near Maishofen and originally wanted to be a priest. After a meeting with Albert Paris Gütersloh while he was attending the Gymnasium in Bolzano, however, he became interested in painting. From 1904 to 1906, he attended a private art school operated by Robert Scheffer in Vienna, then transferred to the Academy of Fine Arts where he studied with Alois Delug and Christian Griepenkerl.

In 1909 he resigned from the Academy and, together with Anton Kolig, Franz Wiegele and Egon Schiele, became one of the founders of the "", to protest the Academy's conservative attitudes. From 1909 to 1912, he travelled to Ticino, Northern Italy and Berlin and exhibited widely. In 1913, he married Ida Andersen, the sister of his friend Robin. Because of World War I, he moved back to Maishofen in 1915.

Nevertheless, he was forced to do military service from 1916 to 1918 with the k.u.k.-Infanterieregiment Nr. 59; although he served unarmed, due to "unsuitability". After July 1917, he was stationed at the Heeresgeschichtliches Museum "for special purposes", where he helped organize war art exhibitions with his old friend Schiele.

The post-war period
His wife died the night before their first exhibition. Two years later, he remarried. By 1925, he was suffering from lung and stomach disorders and made several therapeutic trips to Bolzano.

That same year, he received a major commission to paint frescoes at the new Kleines Festspielhaus in Salzburg. This was followed by similar commissions at the seminary in Bamberg and a castle in the  district of Vienna. During this period, his second marriage failed and he lived with his mistress.

In 1926 he was offered a professorship at the Academy, but did not accept. He returned to Vienna in 1927, but continued to travel, especially in Italy. Three years later, he had a stomach hemorrhage and died following surgery. He was buried in Maishofen with a grave memorial designed by Clemens Holzmeister. A street in Salzburg is named after him and the State of Salzburg has awarded an "" for art since 1972.

Selected paintings

Writings 
 Neue Malerei in Österreich. Betrachtungen eines Malers. Vienna: Amalthea 1923.

References

Further reading 
 Arthur Roessler: Der Maler Anton Faistauer. Beiträge zur Lebens- und Schaffensgeschichte eines österreichischen Künstlers. Büchergilde Gutenberg, Vienna 1947
 Franz Fuhrmann: Anton Faistauer. Residenz-Verlag, Salzburg 1972, reissued by the University of Michigan Library, (2007)

External links 

 Anton Faistauer Forum
 Seite zu Anton Faistauer @ Maishofen Tourism website
  Article in the SalzburgerLand magazine on the 125th anniversary of his birth.
 Salzburg Museum: Anton Faistauer 1887-1930 Retrospective exhibition, 11 February to 22 May 2005
 
 Biography, Literature and Works by Anton Faistauer

20th-century Austrian painters
Austrian male painters
Artists from Salzburg
1887 births
1930 deaths
20th-century Austrian male artists